Hey! Hey! Cowboy is a lost 1927 American silent Western film directed by Lynn Reynolds and Edward Laemmle and starring Hoot Gibson. It was produced and released by Universal Pictures.

Cast
 Hoot Gibson as Jimmie Roberts
 Nick Cogley as Julius Decker
 Kathleen Key as Emily Decker
 Wheeler Oakman as John Evans
 Clark Comstock as Joe Billings
 Monte Montague as Hank Mander
 Milla Davenport as Aunt Jane
 Jim Corey as Blake
 Slim Summerville as Spike Doolin

References

External links
 
 

1927 films
1927 Western (genre) films
1927 lost films
Films directed by Lynn Reynolds
Films directed by Edward Laemmle
Lost American films
Lost Western (genre) films
Silent American Western (genre) films
Universal Pictures films
1920s American films